Catiline or Catilina (Latin) may refer to:

 Catiline, Lucius Sergius Catilina (108 BC–62 BC), Roman politician and author of a conspiracy to overthrow the Roman Republic
 Conspiracy of Catiline, 63 BC failed plot against the Roman Republic by Catilina
 Catiline Orations (63 BC) of Cicero, exposing the Catilinarian conspiracy to the Roman Senate
 The Conspiracy of Catiline, one of Sallust's two major surviving works
 Catiline His Conspiracy (1611), a tragedy by Ben Jonson
 Catilina (1792), opera by Antonio Salieri with libretto by Giovanni Battista Casti
 Catiline (play) (1850), Henrik Ibsen's first play
 Catilina Aubameyang (b. 1983), Gabonese soccer player

See also
 Catalina (disambiguation)